Iraqi nationality is transmitted by one's parents.

History
The first nationality law was passed in 1924, and that year, on 6 August, all people within the bounds of Iraqi jurisdiction automatically acquired Iraqi citizenship. According to Zainab Saleh,  "The 1924 Iraqi Nationality Law and its amendments bring to light the haunted origins of Arab nationalism" by defining Iraqis of Persian descent as second-class citizens.

Dual citizenship
Iraq recognizes dual nationality.

Travel freedom

In 2016, Iraqi citizens had visa-free or visa on arrival access to 30 countries and territories. Thus, the Iraqi passport ranks 102nd in the world, according to the Visa Restrictions Index.

See also
 Nationality law
 Iraqi passport
 Iraq National Card

References

External links
 Iraqi General Directorate For Nationality 
 Nationality | UNHCR Guidance on Nationality Law

Nationality law
Law of Iraq
Politics of Iraq
Government of Iraq
Human rights in Iraq